Kim Sung-hoon (born March 11, 1978), better known as Ha  Jung-woo, is a South Korean actor, film director, screenwriter and film producer. One of the highest grossing actors in South Korea, Ha's starring films have accumulated more than 100 million tickets. Only 3 other actors have reached this milestone, with Ha being nearly a decade younger than the rest when achieving this. 

His breakthrough to stardom came with the role in Na Hong-jin's serial killer film The Chaser (2008). One of the leading actors of his generation in Korean cinema, Ha showcased his versatility across films of various genres: road movie My Dear Enemy (2008), sports film Take Off (2009), action thriller The Yellow Sea (2010), gangster saga Nameless Gangster: Rules of the Time (2012), romantic comedy Love Fiction (2012), spy actioner The Berlin File (2013), and action thriller The Terror Live (2013). Ha is also known for his role as grim reaper Gang-rim in the fantasy action film Along with the Gods: The Two Worlds (2017) and its 2018 sequel. 

He made his directorial debut through the comedy film Fasten Your Seatbelt (2013), followed by Chronicle of a Blood Merchant (2015).

Early life
Born as Kim Sung-hoon, Ha Jung-woo came from an acting family. His father Kim Yong-gun is a well-known veteran actor who has appeared in many movies and television series, while his younger brother Kim Young-hoon (stage name: Cha Hyun-woo) is an aspiring actor. Ha has said that since he was 4 or 5 years old, he has always dreamed of becoming an actor like his father. Before entering college, Ha studied at a private acting institute and at one point had actor Lee Beom-soo as his instructor. He then enrolled at Chung-Ang University as a theater major, where he acted on the stage.

In 1998, Ha began his military service, working in the Armed Forces Public Relations Department. He put his acting experience to good use during this time, appearing in 10 promotional films for the military.

Career

2002–2007: Beginnings
Kim Sung-hoon made his acting debut in the 2002 SBS sitcom Honest Living and his feature film debut in the 2003 film Madeleine. For the next few years, Kim's acting career was relatively low-key, appearing in several supporting roles, but not receiving a lot of attention. In 2005, Kim signed with talent agency SidusHQ and on their recommendation adopted the stage name "Ha Jung-woo." He then appeared in his first starring role in the indie film The Unforgiven, a blistering critique of the physical and psychological violence within military ranks.

Ha's subsequent roles in controversial arthouse director Kim Ki-duk's Time and Breath brought more notice to his acting talents in Korea and overseas. His portrayal of a cool-headed prosecutor who is romantically involved with a feisty police officer played by Go Hyun-jung in the popular MBC drama series H.I.T attracted female fans and gained him popularity among the masses. He also starred in the American indie film Never Forever opposite Vera Farmiga, which garnered praise from the film festival circuit.

2008–2009: Breakout
Ha's breakout came in the 2008 film The Chaser, in which he played a psychopath character loosely based on serial killer Yoo Young-chul. The movie became a huge hit at the Korean box office, raking in over 5 million ticket sales, while also garnering high praise from critics and numerous awards from local award-giving bodies. American director Martin Scorsese, rumored to be attached to a Hollywood remake of The Chaser, has complimented Ha as having as much potential as his The Departed stars Leonardo DiCaprio and Matt Damon.
Ha followed this up with a portrayal of a charming scoundrel in My Dear Enemy that same year, showcased his versatility and elevated his status as one of the most sought-after actors in the Korean film industry. From 2008-2009, he took on diverse but compelling roles in The Moonlight of Seoul, Boat, and Take Off. Take Off, based on the Korean national ski jumping team, became one of the biggest box office hits of 2009.

2009–2013: Commercial and critical success
Ha reunited with his The Chaser director Na Hong-jin and costar Kim Yoon-seok in Na's sophomore feature The Yellow Sea, which netted Ha Best Actor trophies from the Asian Film Awards, Baeksang Arts Awards and the Korean Association of Film Critics. Ha then starred in the legal thriller The Client, which evoked his early days of theater, and the director praised Ha for his "moments of true brilliance and genius" during the production.
In early 2012, Samsung Electronics produced an ambitious PPL-frequent-film project featuring Galaxy Note, their latest Tablet hybrid mobile. Titled as Cine Note, the giant project comprises three shorts by directors Kang Hyeong-cheol, Jang Hoon and E J-yong. Ha played the leading role for all the three of the films, while celebrated musician Lee Seung-chul produced music using the device, and noted webtoon artists Son Jae-ho and Lee Gwang-soo created the film’s animated content.

Nameless Gangster: Rules of the Time was Ha's third collaboration with longtime friend director Yoon Jong-bin, also starring acclaimed veteran actor Choi Min-sik. This was followed shortly by the unconventional romantic comedy Love Fiction opposite Gong Hyo-jin. Both were box office hits. After wrapping Love Fiction, Ha along with Gong and 14 other actors went on a cross-country walking trip from Seoul to Haenam, South Jeolla Province. Their journey was chronicled in the documentary 577 Project, denoting the total distance covered in kilometers. Ha was in charge of three aspects of the production including planning, acting and casting. He said he did it to thank fans for their support after he won back-to-back Best Actor awards at the 2010 and 2011 Baeksang Arts Awards.
In Ryoo Seung-wan's The Berlin File, Ha starred as a North Korean agent in Berlin who is betrayed and cut loose in the midst of a financial espionage intrigue. He then appeared the action thriller The Terror Live, playing a news anchor with an exclusive, live broadcast on a terrorist attack.

2014–present: Career resurgence and return to television and film
Ha then made his directorial debut with Rollercoaster (released internationally as Fasten Your Seatbelt), based on his own screenplay about the comic interactions between the cabin crew and passengers (including an arrogant Hallyu star played by Jung Kyung-ho) of a flight from Tokyo to Gimpo International Airport which becomes in danger of crashing when the plane hits a major storm. The film was a box office success.

Working with Yoon Jong-bin again, Ha played a Joseon era butcher-turned-outlaw in the period action film Kundo: Age of the Rampant. 
In 2015, Ha directed, wrote and starred in Chronicle of a Blood Merchant, a film adaptation of Chinese author Yu Hua's 1995 novel. He then appeared in one of the biggest domestic hits of the year, Choi Dong-hoon's Assassination about resistance fighters given orders to kill a Japanese army commander in the colonial era.

In 2016, Ha starred again in two box office hits; Park Chan-wook's The Handmaiden, an adaptation of the Sarah Waters novel Fingersmith also set during 1930s Korea;, and survival thriller The Tunnel.

In 2017, Ha starred in Kim Yong-hwa's Along With the Gods: The Two Worlds, an adaptation of the webtoon Along With the Gods, about a court in the afterlife where the deceased undergo multiple trials for 49 days, and 1987: When the Day Comes, about a political crisis that led to the June Democratic Uprising in 1987 which ended the military regime of President Chun Doo-hwan. He reprised his role as Gang-rim in the 2018 sequel, Along with the Gods: The Last 49 Days. 

In 2018, Ha starred in the action thriller Take Point, reuniting with The Terror Lives director Kim Byung-woo.

In 2019, Ha was cast in the science fiction action film Mount Paektu.

In 2020, Ha starred in the horror film The Closet, and Boston 1947, the story of the 1947 Boston International Marathon.

Other activities
Ha is also an artist. Though it began as a hobby in his university days, Ha began painting in earnest in 2007. His paintings, all done in a hybrid of Pop art and Expressionist styles, have been displayed in several solo art exhibitions. Critics have said his paintings, with their strong colors and interesting composition are reminiscent of those by American artist Jean-Michel Basquiat. "Life as an actor is like living through an invisible war. Paintings soothe me and make me rational. It is too extravagant to say that painting is my hobby; it is rather a way for me to survive as an actor," said Ha.

In 2011 he published a compilation of essays titled Ha Jung-woo, Good Feeling. Besides his musings on life, Ha also wrote his thoughts on famous artists such as Pablo Picasso. The book also included about 60 of his own drawings.

Personal life
Ha dated fashion model Goo Eun-ae from August 2008 to January 2012.

Filmography

Film

As actor

As filmmaker

Television series

Web series

Web shows

Music video
"Betrayal" (Big Mama, 2007)

Theater
Othello (2003)
Waiting for Godot (2002)
The Glass Menagerie (2002)
The Good Doctor (2001)
Carmen (2001)
Be Strong, Geum-soon! (2000)

Discography
"Alaska" (Romantic Chimpanzee feat. Ha Jung-woo - Love Fiction OST, 2012)

Book
Ha Jung-woo, Good Feeling (essays, 2011)

  Walker, Ha Jung-woo (essays, 2018)

Awards and nominations

Listicles

References

External links

 
 
 

South Korean film directors
South Korean film producers
South Korean screenwriters
South Korean male film actors
South Korean male television actors
South Korean male stage actors
Chung-Ang University alumni
Male actors from Seoul
1978 births
Living people
21st-century South Korean male actors
Gwangsan Kim clan
Best Actor Asian Film Award winners